"High for Hours" is a song by American rapper J. Cole. The song was released as a single on January 18, 2017. It was produced by Elite, with co-production from Cam O'bi. The song was considered for Cole's fourth studio album, 4 Your Eyez Only, but was not included. It was uploaded to Cole's SoundCloud page on Martin Luther King Day, January 16, 2017, and has over 11 million plays on SoundCloud as of October 2018. It treats themes including oppression, revolution, and a meeting with Barack Obama.

Background
Producer Elite spoke about the song in an interview with DJBooth saying:

Critical reception
Writing for Odyssey, Paul Watson Jr. called the track an "emotional journey" saying, "From a personal perspective, this four-and-a-half minute, three-verse song took me on a roller coaster of different emotional synapses, which isn’t by any means uncharacteristic of Cole. What was interesting, however, was the cerebral approach to lyrics Cole took, which is usually a trait attributed to Kendrick Lamar, while simultaneously maintaining his characteristic simplicity."

Chart performance

References

2017 songs
J. Cole songs
Songs written by J. Cole
2017 singles
Roc Nation singles
Interscope Records singles
Jazz rap songs